The Tajikistan national futsal team (Timi Millii Futsoli Tojikiston) represents Tajikistan in international futsal competitions and is controlled by the Tajikistan Football Federation, the governing body for futsal in Tajikistan.

Tournaments

FIFA Futsal World Cup

AFC Futsal Championship

Futsal at the Asian Indoor and Martial Arts Games

Players

Current squad
Players called for the 2018 AFC Futsal Championship.

Previous squads

AFC Futsal Championship
2018 AFC Futsal Championship squads

See also
Tajikistan national football team
Tajikistan national under-17 football team
Tajikistan national under-20 football team
Tajikistan national under-23 football team
Tajikistan futsal league

References

Dejan Djedovic new head coach of National team of Tajikistan

Asian national futsal teams
Futsal
national